Bioconvergence is a multidisciplinary method in life science. It uses the synergy between biotech, engineering and computerized systems to address unresolved challenges, like speeding up diagnostic processes, creating more advanced materials, or advancing drug development. 
Along with healthcare, bioconvergence assists in the improvement of various sectors such as agriculture, energy, food, security, climate, etc. McKinsey research predicts that more than half of the impact of bioconvergence will be outside of healthcare, in areas such as agriculture, aquaculture and food, consumer products and services (such as DNA and microbiome testing), novel materials, chemistry and energy.

Implications
Bioconvergence uses methods from disciplines such as biology, chemistry, physics, engineering, medicine, mathematics, agriculture, computational sciences and artificial intelligence (AI), in order to solve challenges across several sectors.

Healthcare

Bioconvergence technologies in healthcare include translational medicine, enabling the extraction of hidden insights from massive data sets; neuromorphic computing, who seeks to emulate the biological neural structure of the brain to achieve unparalleled levels of processing performance and energy efficiency; creation of digital twins for clinical trials; and biochips such as organ on a chip" (OOC). Other implications of bioconvergence include new methods ot using nanorobotics for drug delivery, regenerative medicine, diagnostics and biological sensors, optogenetics, bioelectronics, engineered "living" materials, and more. According to Belén Garijo, CEO of Merck, bioconvergence can also bring about the potential of personalized medicine".

Food and agriculture

Traditional agriculture relies on land, water, and a suitable climate. In the future, based on bioconvergence led research and technologies, foods could be manufactured anywhere in labs and indoor vertical farms. This could fundamentally reshape the agricultural sector, international trade, and migration, as well as people’s relationships with land, animals, and food.

Applications also include innovative new ways to conduct breeding of animals and plants using molecular or genetic markers that are many times quicker than established selective-breeding methods; new, more precise tools for the genetic engineering of plants; fast-developing work using the microbiome of plants, soil, animals, and water to improve the quality and productivity of agricultural production; and the development of alternative proteins, including cultured meat, alternative eggs, and alternative milk.

Energy, climate and advanced materials
Bioconvergence could transform the natural resource sector through new ways of making and obtaining raw materials and fuels, as well as new manufacturing techniques. This could potentially ease pressure on natural resources.

History
The term "bioconvergence" was used in 2005 to describe the integration of bio and information-technologies into the healthcare industry. Since 2020, it has gained wider recognition. 

In April 2020, The European Investment Bank and the Israel Innovation Authority concluded a cooperation agreement to jointly pursue investments in the globally emerging domain of bioconvergence. 

In March 2021, the US National Intelligence Council (NIC), which bridges the United States Intelligence Community with policy makers in the US, published a research paper on the "Future of Biology", concluding that "During the next 20 years, a more multidisciplinary and data-intensive approach to life sciences will shift our understanding of and ability to manipulate living matter. These disciplines, combined with cognitive science, nanotechnology, physics, and others, are propelling new leaps in our understanding. It is anticipated that the collective application of these diverse technologies to the life sciences—known as bioconvergence— will accelerate discovery and predictability in biotech design and production." 

In September 2021, CELLINK Life Sciences, a Swedish publicly traded company that commercialized the first bio-based ink in 2016, changed its group name to BICO Group, short for "bioconvergence." It is building a portfolio that blends biology, engineering and computer science technologies and considering acquisition opportunities in bioconvergence technology companies.

In May 2022, Israel launched a 5-year national plan worth  to boost research and development in bioconvergence. Also in May 2022, Ben-Gurion University of the Negev (BGU) and Soroka Medical Center announced a strategic collaboration for the development of novel technologies in the field of bioconvergence.

In October 2022, Japan announced that it will establish a global center of bioconvergence innovation in the Okinawa Institute of Science and Technology. It will be supported by a grant from the Japan Science and Technology Agency JST Program on Open Innovation Platform for Academia-Industry Co-Creation. 

According to a McKinsey report on public policy and "Biological innovations for complex problems", The Israel Innovation Authority, responsible for Israel's innovation policy and financial support for Research and Development technology driven companies, is "investing in bioconvergence technologies to ensure that professionals in biology, computer science, mathematics, engineering, and nanoscience work seamlessly together". The Israel Innovation Authority views bioconvergence as potentially "one of the next significant growth engines of Israeli high-tech".

Market
According to research company Grand View Research, the global bioconvergence market was valued at USD 110.9 billion in 2021 and is anticipated to expand at a compound annual growth rate (CAGR) of 7.4% from 2022 to 2030. The significant market growth can be attributed to the increasing elderly population and the accelerating stem cell technology for the fixing of injured cells, tissues, and organs.

References

Further reading 

 
 
 

Biotechnology
Biological engineering
Medical technology
Emerging technologies